Carsten Ball and Chris Guccione are the defending champions. They successfully defended their title, defeating Adam Feeney and Greg Jones in the final 6–1, 6–3.

Seeds

Draw

Draw

References
 Doubles Draw
 Qualifying Draw

Comerica Bank Challenger - Doubles
Nordic Naturals Challenger